Deh Now-e Do may refer to:
 Deh Now-e Do, Bardsir